The European Journal of Public Health is a bimonthly peer-reviewed public health journal. It was established in 1991 and is published by Oxford University Press on behalf of the European Public Health Association. The editor-in-chief is Peter Allebeck (Stockholm County Council and Karolinska Institutet). According to the Journal Citation Reports, the journal has a 2020 impact factor of 3.367.

References

External links 

Public health journals
Oxford University Press academic journals
Academic journals associated with international learned and professional societies of Europe
Bimonthly journals
Publications established in 1991